Strakhov is a rural locality (a khutor) in Dubrovskoye Rural Settlement, Kikvidzensky District, Volgograd Oblast, Russia. The population was 196 as of 2010.

Geography 
Strakhov is located on Khopyorsko-Buzulukskaya plain, on the left bank of the Kardail River, 24 km northwest of Preobrazhenskaya (the district's administrative centre) by road. Galushkinsky is the nearest rural locality.

References 

Rural localities in Kikvidzensky District